The term bioarchaeology has been attributed to British archaeologist Grahame Clark who, in 1972, defined it as the study of animal and human bones from archaeological sites. Redefined in 1977 by Jane Buikstra, bioarchaeology in the United States now refers to the scientific study of human remains from archaeological sites, a discipline known in other countries as osteoarchaeology, osteology or palaeo-osteology. Compared to bioarchaeology, osteoarchaeology is the scientific study that solely focus on the human skeleton. The human skeleton is used to tell us about health, lifestyle, diet, mortality and physique of the past. Furthermore, palaeo-osteology is simple the study of ancient bones.

In contrast, the term bioarchaeology is used in Europe to describe the study of all biological remains from archaeological sites. Although Clark used it to describe just human remains and animal remains (zoology/archaeozoology/zooarchaeology), increasingly modern archaeologists also include botanical remains (botany/archaeobotany/paleobotany/paleoethnobotany).

Bioarchaeology was largely born from the practices of New Archaeology, which developed in the United States in the 1970s as a reaction to a mainly cultural-historical approach to understanding the past.  Proponents of New Archaeology advocated using processual methods to test hypotheses about the interaction between culture and biology, or a biocultural approach. Some archaeologists advocate a more holistic approach to bioarchaeology that incorporates critical theory and is more relevant to modern descent populations.

If possible, human remains from archaeological sites are analyzed to determine sex, age, and health.  The results are used to determine patterns relevant to human behavior at the site.

Paleodemography 
Paleodemography is the field that attempts to identify demographic characteristics from the past population. The information gathered is used to make interpretations. Bioarchaeologists use paleodemography sometimes and create life tables, a type of cohort analysis, to understand the demographic characteristics (such as risk of death or sex ratio) of a given age cohort within a population.  Age and sex are crucial variables in the construction of a life table, although this information is often not available to bioarchaeologists. Therefore, it is often necessary to estimate the age and sex of individuals based on specific morphological characteristics of the skeleton.

Age estimation 
The estimation of age in bioarchaeology and osteology actually refers to an approximation of skeletal or biological age-at-death. The primary assumption in age estimation is that an individual's skeletal age is closely associated with their chronological age. Age estimation can be based on patterns of growth and development or degenerative changes in the skeleton. Many methods tracking these types of changes have been developed using a variety of skeletal series. For instance, in children age is typically estimated by assessing their dental development, ossification and fusion of specific skeletal elements, or long bone length. For children, the different points of time at which different teeth erupt from the gums are best known for telling a child's age down to the exact year. But once the teeth are fully developed, age is hard to determine using teeth.  In adults, degenerative changes to the pubic symphysis, the auricular surface of the ilium, the sternal end of the 4th rib, and dental attrition are commonly used to estimate skeletal age.

When using bones to determine age, there might be problems that you might face. Until the age of about 30, the human bones are still growing. Different bones are fusing at different points of growth. Some bones might not follow the correct stages of growth which can mess with your analysis. Also, as you get older there is wear and tear on the humans' bones and the age estimate becomes less precise as the bone gets older. The bones then become categorized as either 'young' (20–35 years), 'middle' (35–50 years), or 'old' (50+ years).

Sex determination 

Differences in male and female skeletal anatomy are used by bioarchaeologists to determine the biological sex of human skeletons.  Humans are sexually dimorphic, although overlap in body shape and sexual characteristics is possible. Not all skeletons can be assigned a sex, and some may be wrongly identified as male or female.  Sexing skeletons is based on the observation that biological males and biological females differ most in the skull and pelvis; bioarchaeologists focus on these parts of the body when determining sex, although other body parts can also be used.  The female pelvis is generally broader than the male pelvis, and the angle between the two inferior pubic rami (the sub-pubic angle) is wider and more U-shaped, while the sub-pubic angle of the male is more V-shaped and less than 90 degrees.  Phenice details numerous visual differences between the male and female pelvis.

In general, the male skeleton is more robust than the female skeleton because of the greater muscles mass of the male. Males generally have more pronounced brow ridges, nuchal crests, and mastoid processes.  It should be remembered that skeletal size and robustness are influenced by nutrition and activity levels. Pelvic and cranial features are considered to be more reliable indicators of biological sex.  Sexing skeletons of young people who have not completed puberty is more difficult and problematic than sexing adults, because the body has not had time to develop fully.

Bioarchaeological sexing of skeletons is not error-proof.  In reviewing the sexing of Egyptian skulls from Qua and Badari, Mann found that 20.3% could be assigned to a different sex than the sex indicated in the archaeological literature. A re-evaluation of Mann's work showed that he did not understand the tomb numbering system of the old excavation and assigned wrong tomb numbers to the skulls. The sexing of the bone material was actually quite correct. However, recording errors and re-arranging of human remains may play a part in this great incidence of misidentification.

Direct testing of bioarchaeological methods for sexing skeletons by comparing gendered names on coffin plates from the crypt at Christ Church, Spitalfields, London to the associated remains resulted in a 98 percent success rate.

Sex-based differences are not inherently a form of inequality, but become an inequality when members of one sex are given privileges based on their sex.  This stems from society investing differences with cultural and social meaning.  Gendered work patterns may make their marks on the bones and be identifiable in the archaeological record. Molleson found evidence of gendered work patterns by noting extremely arthritic big toes, a collapse of the last dorsal vertebrae, and muscular arms and legs among female skeletons at Abu Hureyra.  She interpreted this sex-based pattern of skeletal difference as indicative of gendered work patterns. These kinds of skeletal changes could have resulted from women spending long periods of time kneeling while grinding grain with the toes curled forward. Investigation of gender from mortuary remains is of growing interest to archaeologists.

Non-specific stress indicators

Dental non-specific stress indicators

Enamel hypoplasia 
Enamel hypoplasia refers to transverse furrows or pits that form in the enamel surface of teeth when the normal process of tooth growth stops, resulting in a deficit of enamel.  Enamel hypoplasias generally form due to disease and/or poor nutrition.  Linear furrows are commonly referred to as linear enamel hypoplasias (LEHs); LEHs can range in size from microscopic to visible to the naked eye.  By examining the spacing of perikymata grooves (horizontal growth lines), the duration of the stressor can be estimated, although Mays argues that the width of the hypoplasia bears only an indirect relationship to the duration of the stressor.

Studies of dental enamel hypoplasia are used to study child health.  Unlike bone, teeth are not remodeled, so they can provide a more reliable indicator of past health events as long as the enamel remains intact. Dental hypoplasias provide an indicator of health status during the time in childhood when the enamel of the tooth crown is being formed. Not all of the enamel layers are visible on the surface of the tooth because enamel layers that are formed early in crown development are buried by later layers. Hypoplasias on this part of the tooth do not show on the surface of the tooth.  Because of this buried enamel, teeth record stressors form a few months after the start of the event.  The proportion of enamel crown formation time represented by this buried in enamel varies from up to 50 percent in molars to 15-20 percent in anterior teeth.  Surface hypoplasias record stressors occurring from about one to seven years, or up to 13 years if the third molar is included.

Skeletal non-specific stress indicators

Porotic hyperostosis/cribra orbitalia 
It was long assumed that iron deficiency anemia has marked effects on the flat bones of the cranium of infants and young children. That as the body attempts to compensate for low iron levels by increasing red blood cell production in the young, sieve-like lesions develop in the cranial vaults (termed porotic hyperostosis) and/or the orbits (termed cribra orbitalia). This bone is spongy and soft.

It is however, highly unlikely that iron deficiency anemia is a cause of either porotic hyperostosis or cribra orbitalia. These are more likely the result of vascular activity in these areas and are unlikely to be pathological. The development of cribra orbitalia and porotic hyperostosis could also be attributed to other causes besides an iron deficiency in the diet, such as nutrients lost to intestinal parasites.  However, dietary deficiencies are the most probable cause.

Anemia incidence may be a result of inequalities within society, and/or indicative of different work patterns and activities among different groups within society.  A study of iron-deficiency among early Mongolian nomads showed that although overall rates of cribra orbitalia declined from 28.7 percent (27.8 percent of the total female population, 28.4 percent of the total male population, 75 percent of the total juvenile population) during the Bronze and Iron Ages, to 15.5 percent during the Hunnu (2209–1907 BP) period, the rate of females with cribra orbitalia remained roughly the same, while the incidence of cribra orbitalia among males and children declined (29.4 percent of the total female population, 5.3 percent of the total male population, and 25 percent of the juvenile population had cribra orbitalia).  Bazarsad posits several reasons for this distribution of cribra orbitalia: adults may have lower rates of cribra orbitalia than juveniles because lesions either heal with age or lead to death.  Higher rates of cribia orbitalia among females may indicate lesser health status, or greater survival of young females with cribia orbitalia into adulthood.

Harris lines 
Harris lines form before adulthood, when bone growth is temporarily halted or slowed down due to some sort of stress (either disease or malnutrition). During this time, bone mineralization continues, but growth does not, or does so at very reduced levels.  If and when the stressor is overcome, bone growth will resume, resulting in a line of increased mineral density that will be visible in a radiograph. If there is not recovery from the stressor, no line will be formed.

Hair 
The stress hormone cortisol is deposited in hair as it grows.  This has been used successfully to detect fluctuating levels of stress in the later lifespan of mummies.

Mechanical stress and activity indicators 

Examining the effects that activities and workload has upon the skeleton allows the archaeologist to examine who was doing what kinds of labor, and how activities were structured within society. The division of labor within the household may be divided according to gender and age, or be based on other hierarchical social structures. Human remains can allow archaeologists to uncover patterns in the division of labor.

Living bones are subject to Wolff's law, which states that bones are physically affected and remodeled by physical activity or inactivity.  Increases in mechanical stress tend to produce bones that are thicker and stronger.  Disruptions in homeostasis caused by nutritional deficiency or disease or profound inactivity/disuse/disability can lead to bone loss.  While the acquisition of bipedal locomotion and body mass appear to determine the size and shape of children's bones, activity during the adolescent growth period seems to exert a greater influence on the size and shape of adult bones than exercise later in life.

Muscle attachment sites (also called entheses) have been thought to be impacted in the same way causing what were once called musculoskeletal stress markers, but now widely named entheseal changes. These changes were widely used to study activity-patterns, but research has shown that processes associated with aging have a greater impact than occupational stresses. It has also been shown that geometric changes to bone structure (described above) and entheseal changes differ in their underlying cause with the latter poorly affected by occupation. Joint changes, including osteoarthritis, have also been used to infer occupations but in general these are also manifestations of the aging process.

Markers of occupational stress, which include morphological changes to the skeleton and dentition as well as joint changes at specific locations have also been widely used to infer specific (rather than general) activities. Such markers are often based on single cases described in clinical literature in the late nineteenth century. One such marker has been found to be a reliable indicator of lifestyle: the external auditory exostosis also called surfer's ear, which is a small bony protuberance in the ear canal which occurs in those working in proximity to cold water.

One example of how these changes have been used to study activities is the New York African Burial Ground in New York. This provides evidence of the brutal working conditions under which the enslaved labored; osteoarthritis of the vertebrae was very common, even among the young.  The pattern of osteoarthritis combined with the early age of onset provides evidence of labor that resulted in mechanical strain to the neck.  One male skeleton shows stress lesions at 37 percent of 33 muscle or ligament attachments, showing he experienced significant musculoskeletal stress.  Overall, the interred show signs of significant musculoskeletal stress and heavy workloads, although workload and activities varied among different individuals.  Some individuals show high levels of stress, while others do not.  This references the variety of types of labor (e.g., domestic vs. carrying heavy loads) labor that enslaved individuals were forced to perform.

Injury and workload 
Fractures to bones during or after excavation will appear relatively fresh, with broken surfaces appearing white and unweathered.  Distinguishing between fractures around the time of death and post-depositional fractures in bone is difficult, as both types of fractures will show signs of weathering.  Unless evidence of bone healing or other factors are present, researchers may choose to regard all weathered fractures as post-depositional.

Evidence of perimortal fractures (or fractures inflicted on a fresh corpse) can be distinguished in unhealed metal blade injuries to the bones.  Living or freshly dead bones are somewhat resilient, so metal blade injuries to bone will generate a linear cut with relatively clean edges rather than irregular shattering. Archaeologists have tried using the microscopic parallel scratch marks on cut bones in order to estimate the trajectory of the blade that caused the injury.

Diet and dental health

Caries 
Dental caries, commonly referred to as cavities or tooth decay, are caused by localized destruction of tooth enamel, as a result of acids produced by bacteria feeding upon and fermenting carbohydrates in the mouth.  Subsistence based upon agriculture is strongly associated with a higher rate of caries than subsistence based upon foraging, because of the higher levels of carbohydrates in diets based upon agriculture. For example, bioarchaeologists have used caries in skeletons to correlate a diet of rice and agriculture with the disease.   Females may be more vulnerable to caries compared to men, due to lower saliva flow than males, the positive correlation of estrogens with increased caries rates, and because of physiological changes associated with pregnancy, such as suppression of the immune system and a possible concomitant decrease in antimicrobial activity in the oral cavity.

Stable isotope analysis

Overview 
Stable isotope biogeochemistry is a powerful tool that utilizes variations in isotopic signatures and relates them to biogeochemical processes. The science is based on the preferential fractionation of lighter or heavier isotopes, which results in enriched and depleted isotopic signatures compared to a standard value. Essential elements for life such as carbon, nitrogen, oxygen, and sulfur are the primary stable isotope systems used to interrogate archeological discoveries. Isotopic signatures from multiple systems are typically used in tandem to create a comprehensive understanding of the analyzed material. These systems are most commonly used to trace the geographic origin of archaeological remains and investigate the paleodiets, mobility, and cultural practices of ancient humans. Over the past few decades the use of isotope geochemistry in the context of archaeology has dramatically increased.

System Applications

Carbon 
Stable isotope analysis of carbon in human bone collagen allows bioarchaeologists to carry out dietary reconstruction and to make nutritional inferences. These chemical signatures reflect long-term dietary patterns, rather than a single meal or feast. Isotope ratios in food, especially plant food, are directly and predictably reflected in bone chemistry, allowing researchers to partially reconstruct recent diet using stable isotopes as tracers. Stable isotope analysis monitors the ratio of carbon 13 to carbon 12 (13C/12C), which is expressed as parts per mil (per thousand) using delta notation (δ13C). The 13C and 12C ratio is either depleted (more negative) or enriched (more positive) relative to an international standard. The original standard used in carbon stable isotope analysis is Pee Dee Belemnite (PDB), though this material has since been exhausted and replaced. 12C and 13C occur in a ratio of approximately 98.9 to 1.1.

The ratio of carbon isotopes in consumers varies according to the types of plants digested with different photosynthesis pathways. The three photosynthesis pathways are C3 carbon fixation, C4 carbon fixation and Crassulacean acid metabolism. C4 plants are mainly grasses from tropical and subtropical regions, and are adapted to higher levels of radiation than C3 plants. Corn, millet and sugar cane are some well-known C4 domesticates, while all trees and shrubs use the C3 pathway. C4 carbon fixation is more efficient when temperatures are high and atmospheric CO2 concentrations are low. C3 plants are more common and numerous than C4 plants as C3 carbon fixation is more efficient in a wider range of temperatures and atmospheric CO2 concentrations.

The different photosynthesis pathways used by C3 and C4 plants cause them to discriminate differently towards 13C leading to distinctly different ranges of δ13C. C4 plants range between -9 and -16‰, and C3 plants range between -22 to -34‰. The isotopic signature of consumer collagen is close the δ13C of dietary plants, while apatite , a mineral component of bones and teeth, has an ~14‰ offset from dietary plants due fractionation associated with mineral formation. Stable carbon isotopes have been used as tracers of C4 plants in paleodiets. For example, the rapid and dramatic increase in 13C in human collagen after the adoption of maize agriculture in North America documents the transition from a C3 to a C4 (native plants to corn) diet by 1300 CE.

Skeletons excavated from the Coburn Street Burial Ground (1750 to 1827 CE) in Cape Town, South Africa, were analyzed using stable isotope data in order to determine geographical histories and life histories of the interred. The people buried in this cemetery were assumed to be slaves and members of the underclass based on the informal nature of the cemetery; biomechanical stress analysis and stable isotope analysis, combined with other archaeological data, seem to support this supposition.

Based on stable isotope levels, eight Cobern Street Burial Ground individuals consumed a diet based on C4 (tropical) plants in childhood, then consumed more C3 plants, which were more common at the Cape later in their lives. Six of these individuals had dental modifications similar to those carried out by peoples inhabiting tropical areas known to be targeted by slavers who brought enslaved individuals from other parts of Africa to the colony. Based on this evidence, it was argued that these individuals represent enslaved persons from areas of Africa where C4 plants are consumed and who were brought to the Cape as laborers. These individuals were not assigned to a specific ethnicity, but it is pointed out that similar dental modifications are carried out by the Makua, Yao, and Marav peoples. Four individuals were buried with no grave goods, in accordance with Muslim tradition, facing Signal Hill, which is a point of significance for local Muslims. Their isotopic signatures indicate that they grew up in a temperate environment consuming mostly C3 plants, but some C4 plants. Many of the isotopic signatures of interred individuals indicate that they Cox et al. argue that these individuals were from the Indian Ocean area. They also suggest that these individuals were Muslims. It was argued that stable isotopic analysis of burials, combined with historical and archaeological data can be an effective way in of investigating the worldwide migrations forced by the African Slave Trade, as well as the emergence of the underclass and working class in the colonial Old World.

Nitrogen 
The nitrogen stable isotope system is based on the relative enrichment or depletion of 15N in comparison to 14N in an analyzed material (δ15N). Carbon and nitrogen stable isotope analyses are complementary in paleodiet studies. Nitrogen isotopes in bone collagen are ultimately derived from dietary protein, while carbon can be contributed by protein, carbohydrate, or fat in the diet. δ13C values help distinguish between dietary protein and plant sources while systematic increases in δ15N values as you move up in trophic level helps determine the position of protein sources in the food web. 15N increases about 3-4% with each trophic step upward. It has also been suggested that the relative difference between human δ15N values and animal protein values scales with the proportion of that animal protein in the consumer's diet, though this interpretation has been questioned due to contradictory views on the impact of nitrogen intake through protein consumption and nitrogen loss through waste release on 15N enrichment in the body.

When interpreting δ15N values of human remains, variations in nitrogen values within the same trophic level are also considered. Nitrogen variations in plants, for example, can be caused by plant-specific reliance on nitrogen gas which causes the plant to mirror atmospheric nitrogen isotopic values. Enriched or higher δ15N values can be achieved in plants that grew in soil fertilized by animal waste. Nitrogen isotopes have been used to estimate the relative contributions of legumes verses nonlegumes, as well as terrestrial versus marine resources to the diet. While other plants have δ15N values that range from 2 to 6‰, legumes have lower 14N/15N ratios (close to 0‰, i.e. atmospheric N2) because they can fix molecular nitrogen, rather than having to rely on nitrates and nitrites in the soil. Therefore, one potential explanation for lower δ15N values in human remains is an increased consumption of legumes or animals that eat them. 15N values increase with meat consumption, and decrease with legume consumption. The 14N/15N ratio could be used to gauge the contribution of meat and legumes to the diet.

Oxygen 

The oxygen stable isotope system is based on the 18O/16O (δ18O) in a given material, which is either enriched or depleted relative to a standard. The field typically normalizes to both Vienna Standard Mean Ocean Water (VSMOW) and Standard Light Antarctic Precipitation (SLAP). This system is famous for its use in paleoclimatic studies but it also a prominent source of information in bioarchaeology.

Variations in δ18O values in skeletal remains are directly related to the isotopic composition of the consumer's body water. The isotopic composition of mammalian body water is primarily controlled by consumed water. δ18O values of freshwater drinking sources vary due to mass fractionations related to mechanisms of the global water cycle. Evaporated water vapor will be more enriched in 16O (isotopically lighter; more negative delta value) compared to the body of water left behind which is now depleted in 16O (isotopically heavier; more positive delta value). An accepted first-order approximation for the isotopic composition of animal drinking water is local precipitation, though this is complicated to varying degrees by confounding water sources like natural springs or lakes. The baseline δ18O used in archaeological studies is modified depending on the relevant environmental and historical context of surrounding water sources.

δ18O values of bioapatite in human skeletal remains are assumed to have formed in equilibrium with body water, thus providing a species-specific relationship to oxygen isotopic composition of body water. The same cannot be said for human bone collage, as δ18O values in collagen seem to be impacted by drinking water, food water, and a combination of metabolic and physiological processes. While δ18O values from bone minerals are essentially an averaged isotopic signature throughout the entire life of the individual, dental enamel reflects isotopic signatures specific to early life since enamel is not biologically remodeled.

While carbon and nitrogen are used primarily to investigate the diets of ancient humans, oxygen isotopes offer insight into body water at different stages in a consumer's life. δ18O values are used to understand drinking behaviors, animal husbandry, and track mobility.  97 burials from the ancient Maya citadel of Tikal were studied using oxygen isotopes. Results from tooth enamel identified statistically different individuals, interpreted to be individuals from Maya lowlands, Guatemala, and potentially Mexico. Historical context combined with the isotopic data from the burials is used to argue that migrant individuals were a part of lower and higher social classes within Tikal. It is further suggested that the female migrants who arrived in Tikal during Early Classic period could have been the brides of Maya elite.

Sulfur 
The sulfur stable isotope system is based on small, mass-dependent fractionations of sulfur isotopes in an analyzed material. These fractionations are then reported relative to Canyon Diablo Troilite (V-CDT), the agreed upon standard for the field. The ratio of the most abundant sulfur isotope, 32S, compared to rarer isotopes such as, 33S, 34S, and 36S, is used to characterize biological signatures and geological reservoirs. The fractionation of 34S (δ34S) is particularly useful since it is the most abundant of the rare sulfur isotopes, allowing the fractionations to be biogeochemically meaningful and analytically resolvable. This system is less commonly used on its own and typically acts as a secondary source of information that complements isotopic values of carbon and nitrogen. In bioarchaeology, the sulfur system has been used to investigate consumer paleodiets and spatial behaviors through the analysis of hair and bone collagen. Dietary proteins incorporated into living organisms tend to determine the stable isotope values of their organic tissues. Methionine and cysteine are the two canonical sulfur-containing amino acids. Of the two, δ34S values of methionine are considered to better reflect isotopic compositions of dietary sulfur, since cysteine values are impacted by diet and internal cycling. While other stable isotope systems have significant trophic shifts, there is only a small shift (~0.5‰) observed between the δ34S values.

Consumers yield isotopic signatures that reflect the sulfur reservoir(s) of the dietary protein source. These characteristic values are determined by the isotopic nature of sulfate in the environment. Animal proteins sourced from marine ecosystems tend to have δ34S values between +16 and +17‰, terrestrial plants range from -7‰ to +8‰, and proteins from freshwater and terrestrial ecosystems are highly variable. The sulfate content of the modern ocean is very well-mixed with a δ34S of approximately +21‰, while riverine water is heavily influenced by the sulfur-bearing minerals in surrounding bedrock and terrestrial plants are influenced by the sulfur content of local soils. Estuarian ecosystems have increased complexity due to seawater and river inputs. The extreme range of δ34S values for freshwater ecosystems often interferes with terrestrial signals, making it difficult to use the sulfur system as the sole tool in paleodiet studies.

Various studies have analyzed the isotopic ratios of sulfur in mummified hair. Hair is a good candidate for sulfur studies as it typically contains at least 5% elemental sulfur. One study incorporated sulfur isotope ratios into their paleodietary investigation of four mummified child victims of Incan sacrificial practices. δ34S values helped them determine that the children had not been eating marine protein before their death. Historical insight coupled with consistent sulfur signatures for three of the children suggests that they were living in the same location 6 months prior to the sacrificial ceremony. Studies have also measured δ34S values of bone collagen, though the interpretation of these values was not reliable until quality criteria for the analysis was published in 2009. Though bone collagen is abundant in skeletal remains, less than 1% of the tissue is made of sulfur, making it imperative that these studies carefully assess the meaning of bone collagen δ34S values.

Archaeological uses of DNA 
aDNA analysis of past populations is used by archaeology to genetically determine the sex of individuals, determine genetic relatedness, understand marriage patterns, and investigate prehistoric population movements.

An example of Archaeologists using DNA to find evidence, in 2012 archaeologists found skeletal remains of an adult male. He was buried under a car park in England. with the use of DNA evidence, the archaeologists were able to confirm that the remains belonged to Richard III, the former king of England who died in the Battle of Bosworth.

In 2021, Canadian researchers used DNA analysis on skeletal remains found on King William Island, identifying them as belonging to Warrant Officer John Gregory, an engineer serving aboard HMS Erebus in the ill-fated 1845 Franklin Expedition. He was the first expedition member to be identified by DNA analysis.

Bioarchaeological treatments of equality and inequality 
Aspects of the relationship between the physical body and socio-cultural conditions and practices can be recognized through the study of human remains.  This is most often emphasized in a "biocultural bioarchaeology" model. It has often been the case that bioarchaeology has been regarded as a positivist, science-based discipline, while theories of the living body in the social sciences have been viewed as constructivist in nature. Physical anthropology and bioarchaeology have been criticized for having little to no concern for culture or history. Blakey has argued that scientific or forensic treatments of human remains from archaeological sites construct a view of the past that is neither cultural nor historic, and has suggested that a biocultural version of bioarchaeology will be able to construct a more meaningful and nuanced history that is more relevant to modern populations, especially descent populations.  By biocultural, Blakey means a type of bioarchaeology that is not simply descriptive, but combines the standard forensic techniques of describing stature, sex and age with investigations of demography and epidemiology in order to verify or critique socioeconomic conditions experienced by human communities of the past. The incorporation of analysis regarding the grave goods interred with individuals may further the understanding of the daily activities experienced in life.

Currently, some bioarchaeologists are coming to view the discipline as lying at a crucial interface between the science and the humanities; as the human body is non-static, and is constantly being made and re-made by both biological and cultural factors.

Buikstra considers her work to be aligned with Blakey's biocultural version of bioarchaeology because of her emphasis on models stemming from critical theory and political economy.  She acknowledges that scholars such as Larsen are productive, but points out that his is a different type of bioarchaeology that focuses on quality of life, lifestyle, behavior, biological relatedness, and population history.  It does not closely link skeletal remains to their archaeological context, and is best viewed as a "skeletal biology of the past."

Inequalities exist in all human societies, even so-called “egalitarian” ones. It is important to note that bioarchaeology has helped to dispel the idea that life for foragers of the past was “nasty, brutish and short”; bioarchaeological studies have shown that foragers of the past were often quite healthy, while agricultural societies tend to have increased incidence of malnutrition and disease.  However, based on a comparison of foragers from Oakhurst to agriculturalists from K2 and Mapungubwe, Steyn believes that agriculturalists from K2 and Mapungubwe were not subject to the lower nutritional levels expected for this type of subsistence system.

Danforth argues that more “complex” state-level societies display greater health differences between elites and the rest of society, with elites having the advantage, and that this disparity increases as societies become more unequal.  Some status differences in society do not necessarily mean radically different nutritional levels; Powell did not find evidence of great nutritional differences between elites and commoners, but did find lower rates of anemia among elites in Moundville.

An area of increasing interest among bioarchaeologists interested in understanding inequality is the study of violence. Researchers analyzing traumatic injuries on human remains have shown that a person's social status and gender can have a significant impact on their exposure to violence. There are numerous researchers studying violence, exploring a range of different types of violent behavior among past human societies. Including intimate partner violence, child abuse, institutional abuse, torture, warfare, human sacrifice, and structural violence.

Archaeological ethics 
There are ethical issues with bioarchaeology that revolve around treatment and respect for the dead.  Large-scale skeletal collections were first amassed in the US in the 19th century, largely from the remains of Native Americans.  No permission was ever granted from surviving family for study and display.  Recently, federal laws such as NAGPRA (Native American Graves Protection and Repatriation Act) have allowed Native Americans to regain control over the skeletal remains of their ancestors and associated artifacts in order to reassert their cultural identities.

NAGPRA passed in 1990.  At this time, many archaeologists underestimated the public perception of archaeologists as non-productive members of society and grave robbers. Concerns about occasional mistreatment of Native American remains are not unfounded: in a Minnesota excavation 1971, White and Native American remains were treated differently; remains of White people were reburied, while remains of Native American people were placed in cardboard boxes and placed in a natural history museum. Blakey relates the growth in African American bioarchaeology to NAGPRA and its effect of cutting physical anthropologist off from their study of Native American remains.

Bioarchaeology in Europe is not as affected by these repatriation issues as American bioarchaeology but regardless the ethical considerations associated with working with human remains are, and should, be considered. However, because much of European archaeology has been focused on classical roots, artifacts and art have been overemphasized and Roman and post-Roman skeletal remains were nearly completely neglected until the 1980s. Prehistoric archaeology in Europe is a different story, as biological remains began to be analyzed earlier than in classical archaeology.

See also 
 Ancient DNA
 Biocultural anthropology
 Odontometrics
 Osteoarchaeology
 Paleopathology
 Zooarchaeology

References

Further reading 

 J. Buikstra, 1977.  "Biocultural dimensions of archaeological study: a regional perspective".  In: Biocultural adaptation in prehistoric America, pp. 67–84.  University of Georgia Press.
 J. Buikstra and L. Beck, eds., 2006.  "Bioarchaeology: the Contextual Study of Human Remains."  Elsevier.
 M. Katzenberg and S. Saunders, eds., 2000.  Biological anthropology of the human skeleton.  Wiley.
 K. Killgrove, 2014. Bioarchaeology. In: Oxford Annotated Bibliographies Online. Oxford. 
 C.S. Larsen, 1997.  Bioarchaeology: interpreting behavior from the human skeleton.  Cambridge University Press.
 
 S. Mays, 1998.  The archaeology of human bones.  Routledge.
 Samuel J. Redman, 2016. Bone Rooms: From Scientific Racism to Human Prehistory in Museums.  Harvard University Press.
 M. Parker Pearson, 2001. The archaeology of death and burial.  Texas A&M University Press.
 D. Ubelaker, 1989.  Human skeletal remains: excavation, analysis, interpretation.  Taraxacum.
 T. White, 1991.  Human osteology.  Academic Press.

External links 
Organizations
 American Association of Physical Anthropologists
 Biological Anthropology Section of the American Anthropological Association
 British Association of Biological Anthropologists and Osteoarchaeologists
 Canadian Association for Physical Anthropology

Journals
 American Journal of Physical Anthropology
 International Journal of Osteoarchaeology
 HOMO: Journal of Comparative Human Biology
 International Journal of Paleopathology
 Bioarchaeology of the Near East

Other
 Paleopathology
 The African Burial Ground
 Bioarchaeology and the Center for Bioarchaeological Research
 National NAGPRA homepage
 Bones Don't Lie Blog
 Powered by Osteons Blog
 Kristina Killgrove's Bioarchaeology Blog at Forbes

1970s neologisms
Collections care
Conservation and restoration of cultural heritage
Museology
Cultural heritage
Archaeological science
Art and cultural repatriation
Zooarchaeology